Parcel2Go is a British parcel delivery comparison website providing comparisons of domestic and worldwide postage options from a range of providers.

History
The company was founded in 2000 by father and son Fil and Richard Adams-Mercer together with colleague Steven Kramer. Fil claims he had the idea for an online parcel business while on holiday and bought the "Parcel2go" domain name for £120.  Fil also noticed that neither United Parcel Service nor DHL were offering online access to their courier parcel services at the time.

In 2009 it announced a turnover of £11.6 million. In September 2017 the Parcel2Go merged with National Pallets of Heathfield, East Sussex, the expected benefit for National Pallets being improved IT support, whilst giving Parcel2go an option to offer customers a pallet service for larger deliveries. In November 2019 the company launched a £500,000 fundraising attempt on Crowdcube. A management buyout was backed by Mayfair Equity Partners.

By 2019 the number of employees had risen to 230, and annual turnover to over £100 million.

References

External links
 

Comparison shopping websites